"Left & Right" is the second single from neo soul musician D'Angelo's album Voodoo. The song features guest vocals by hip hop duo Method Man & Redman who also co-wrote the song. The music video was directed by Malik Sayeed.

Background
A part of the musical collective Soulquarians, Dilla served as a frequent collaborator of theirs. Although album tracks such as "Left & Right" and "Devil's Pie" help to bring this claim to light, J Dilla himself was not officially credited for production. However, he contributed significantly to Voodoos overall sound, specifically the rhythm and percussion.
Q-Tip was originally intended to contribute a verse to the song "Left & Right", but was replaced by rappers Method Man & Redman during recording due to creative differences. Questlove has stated that "general opinion was that the song was cool but nobody was feeling Tip's verse". According to former A&R-man Gary Harris, D'Angelo's manager Dominique Trenier "thought that Tip’s verse was wack".

Track listing

A-side
"Left & Right" (Radio Edit) 
"Left & Right" (Explicit Edit) 
"Left & Right" (Instrumental Version)

B-side
"Untitled (How Does It Feel)" 
"Left & Right" (Album Version) 
"Left & Right" (A Capella)

Chart history

References

External links
"Left & Right" at Discogs

1999 singles
D'Angelo songs
Songs written by Method Man
Method Man songs
Redman (rapper) songs
Songs written by D'Angelo
Songs written by Redman (rapper)
Songs written by Q-Tip (musician)
1999 songs
Virgin Records singles